Karkelo is the sixth studio album by Finnish folk metal band Korpiklaani. The title is the Finnish interpretation of the word "party", or otherwise meaning loosely "having fun" or to "frolic".

Pre-release and production
The band started recording material on 15 February. The album was released on 26 June 2009. The songs had the drums recorded in Petrax studio located in Hollola with the rest of the instruments recorded in Grooveland Recording Studio based in Lahti. In support of the album's release, Korpiklaani underwent their first North American tour in April and May 2009.

Three versions of a single for the song "Vodka" were released in anticipation of this album in May 2009. The CD version of the single was released in Finland on 27 May 2009, and the digital single, along with the 7" picture vinyl, were released on 29 May 2009. The B-side of the single is "Juodaan Viinaa".

Track listing

Personnel
 Jonne Järvelä - vocals, guitars, percussion, choirs
 Juho Kauppinen - accordion, guitars on "Uniaika", choirs
 Cane - guitars, choirs
 Hittavainen - fiddle, viola, mandolin, tin whistle
 Jarkko Aaltonen - bass
 Matti Johansson - drums, choirs

Guest musicians
 Aksu Hanttu - backing vocals

Production
 Svante Forsbäck - mastering
 Jan "Örkki" Yrlund - artwork
 Aksu Hanttu - producer, recording, mixing
 Harri Hinkka - photography

References

2009 albums
Korpiklaani albums
Nuclear Blast albums